Norman Frank Cantor (November 19, 1929 – September 18, 2004) was a Canadian-American historian who specialized in the medieval period.  Known for his accessible writing and engaging narrative style, Cantor's books were among the most widely read treatments of medieval history in English. He estimated that his textbook The Civilization of the Middle Ages, first published in 1963, had a million copies in circulation.

Life
Born in Winnipeg, Manitoba, Canada to a Jewish family, Cantor received a Bachelor of Arts degree at the University of Manitoba in 1951. He moved to the United States to obtain an M.A. degree (1953) from Princeton University, then spent a year as a Rhodes Scholar at the University of Oxford. He returned to Princeton and received his Ph.D. in 1957 under the direction of eminent medievalist Joseph R. Strayer. He also began his teaching career at Princeton.

After teaching at Princeton, Cantor became a professor at Columbia University from 1960 to 1966. He was a Leff professor at Brandeis University until 1970 and then was at Binghamton University until 1976, when he took a position at University of Illinois at Chicago for two years. He then went on to New York University (NYU), where he served as Dean of NYU's College of Arts & Sciences, as well as a professor of history, sociology and comparative literature. After a brief stint as Fulbright Professor at the Tel Aviv University History Department (1987–88), he returned to NYU where he taught as a professor emeritus until his retirement in 1999, at which time he devoted himself to working as a full-time writer.

Although his early work focused on English religious and intellectual history, Cantor's later scholarly interests were diverse, and he found more success writing for a popular audience than he did engaging in more narrowly focused original research. He did publish one monograph study, based on his graduate thesis, Church, kingship, and lay investiture in England, 1089-1135, which appeared in 1958 and remains an important contribution to the topic of church-state relations in medieval England. Throughout his career, however, Cantor preferred to write on the broad contours of Western history, and on the history of academic medieval studies in Europe and North America, in particular the lives and careers of eminent medievalists. His books generally received mixed reviews in academic journals, but were often popular bestsellers, buoyed by Cantor's fluid, often colloquial, writing style and his lively critiques of persons and ideas both past and present.

Cantor was intellectually conservative and expressed deep skepticism about what he saw as methodological fads, particularly Marxism and postmodernism, but he also argued for greater inclusion of women and minorities in traditional historical narratives. In his books Inventing the Middle Ages (1991) and Inventing Norman Cantor (2002), he reflected on his strained relationship over the years with other historians and with academia in general.

Upon retirement in 1999, Cantor moved to Miami, Florida, where he continued to work on several books up to the time of his death, including the New York Times bestseller In the Wake of the Plague (2001). He was also editor of Encyclopedia of the Middle Ages (1999).

He died of a heart failure in Miami at the age of 74.

Select bibliography of Cantor's publications
The Medieval World 300-1300 (Macmillan, 1963) ('Norman Cantor, Civilization of the Middle Ages, p. 2.)
Medieval History: The Life and Death of a Civilization (Macmillan, 1963)
William Stubbs on the English Constitution (Crowell, 1966)
How to Study History (with Richard I. Schneider) (Crowell, 1967). A textbook that lays out fundamental methods and principles, including the uses of primary and secondary sources. .
The Age of Protest: Dissent and Rebellion in the Twentieth Century (Hawthorne Books, 1969) .
The English: a history of politics and society to 1760 (Simon and Schuster, 1969).
Western Civilization, Its Genesis and Destiny: the Modern Heritage: From 1500 to the Present (with Kathleen Bolster Greenfield and Francis L. Loewenheim) (Scott, Foresman, 1971) .
Perspectives on the European Past: Conversations with Historians (Macmillan, 1971).
Medieval Society, 400-1450 (with Michael S. Werthman) (Crowell, 1972)
The Meaning of the Middle Ages: A Sociological and Cultural History (Allyn and Bacon, 1973).
Twentieth-Century Culture: Modernism to Deconstruction (P. Lang, 1988).
Inventing the Middle Ages: The Lives, Works and Ideas of the Great Medievalists of the Twentieth Century, (W. Morrow, 1991). Noting that the Middle Ages were not perceived as such until the 20th century, he presents a historiography of views of the Middle Ages in 20 vitae of seminal historians and other shapers of contemporary perception, including C. S. Lewis and J. R. R. Tolkien.
The Civilization of the Middle Ages (Harper Collins, 1993). A revision of the bestseller Medieval History: The Life and Death of a Civilization (1963)..
The Sacred Chain: A History of the Jews (HarperCollins, 1994) .
Medieval Lives: Eight Charismatic Men and Women of the Middle Ages (HarperCollins, 1994). Includes St. Augustine, Hildegard of Bingen, and Christine de Pizan.
The American Century: Varieties of Culture in Modern Times (HarperCollins, 1997). (1st). .
In the Wake of the Plague: The Black Death and the World It Made (Simon & Schuster, 2001) .
Inventing Norman Cantor: Confessions of a Medievalist (Arizona Center for Medieval and Renaissance Studies, Jan 1, 2002). Memoir. .
Antiquity: From the Birth of Sumerian Civilization to the Fall of the Roman Empire (HarperCollins, 2003) .
The Last Knight: The Twilight of the Middle Ages and the Birth of the Modern Era (Harper Perennial, 2004) A look at John of Gaunt. .
Alexander the Great: Journey to the End of the Earth (with Dee Ranieri) (HarperCollins, 2005). Published posthumously..

References

External links
New York Times News Service obituary
The Telegraph newspaper, 1 October 2004 Norman Cantor 
About Inventing the Middle Ages
 Review of Inventing the Middle Ages in New York Review of Books

1929 births
2004 deaths
20th-century Canadian historians
American medievalists
Alumni of Oriel College, Oxford
Princeton University alumni
University of Manitoba alumni
Binghamton University faculty
Brandeis University faculty
Columbia University faculty
New York University faculty
Academic staff of Tel Aviv University
University of Illinois Chicago faculty
Canadian expatriate academics in the United States
Canadian male non-fiction writers
Canadian medievalists
Canadian Rhodes Scholars
Historiographers
Jewish historians
Jewish Canadian writers
People with bipolar disorder
Writers from Winnipeg